Plexin-A4 is a protein that in humans is encoded by the PLXNA4 gene.

Function 

Plexin A4 binds to neuropilin 1 (Nrp1) and neuropilin 2 (Nrp2) and transduces signals from Sema3A, Sema6A, and Sema6B. These Nrp-plexin and semaphorin complexes initiate cascades that regulate diverse processes such as axon pruning and repulsion, dendritic attraction and branching, regulation of cell migration, vascular remodeling, and growth cone collapse. Both upregulation and downregulation of Plexin A4 has been observed following neural injury suggesting a dynamic role for Sema3A and Plexin A4 in neural maintenance and regeneration. Additionally, Sema3A and therefore its receptor, Plexin A4, have been implicated as possible components of fast-fatigable muscle fiber denervation in ALS.

Structure 

Plexin A4 has ~1890 amino acids that include a likely signal sequence, transmembrane domain, and 12 extracellular N-linked glycosylation sites. It also contains domains consistent with other class A plexins including a Sema domain, three "Met-related sequences"/cysteine clusters, three extracellular glycine-proline repeats, intracellular SP domains, and a putative intracellular tyrosine kinase phosphorylation site.

Tissue distribution 

In the adult rat central nervous system (CNS), plexin A4 was present in neurons and fibers throughout the brain and spinal cord, including neocortex, hippocampus, lateral hypothalamus, red nucleus, facial nucleus, and the mesencephalic trigeminal nucleus. Fibers expressed Plexin A4 in the lateral septum, nucleus accumbens, several thalamic nuclei, substantia nigra pars reticulata, zona incerta, pontine reticular formation, as well as in several cranial nerve nuclei. Plexin A4 has been found in dorsal and, to a greater extent, ventral horns of the spinal cord. Both motor neurons and interneurons in the ventral horn express Plexin A4. Motor axons exiting via the ventral roots and the ascending and descending white matter tracts express Plexin A4. In dorsal root ganglia, Plexin A4 is expressed in the neuronal cell bodies as well as the central and peripheral processes of those cells.

References